In astrophysics, Chandrasekhar's white dwarf equation is an initial value ordinary differential equation introduced by the Indian American astrophysicist Subrahmanyan Chandrasekhar, in his study of the gravitational potential of completely degenerate white dwarf stars. The equation reads as

with initial conditions

The boundary  of the equation is defined by the condition

such that the range of  becomes .

Derivation

with pressure  

and density 

where

 

When this is substituted into the hydrostatic equilibrium equation

and letting , we have

gives

where . In other words, once the above equation is solved the density is given by

The mass interior to a specified point can then be calculated

The radius-mass relation of the white dwarf is usually plotted in the plane -.

Solution near the origin

In the neighborhood of the origin, Chandrasekhar provided an asymptotic expansion as

 

where . He also provided numerical solutions for the range .

Equation for small central densities

When the central density  is small, the equation can be reduced to a Lane-Emden equation by introducing

to obtain at leading order, the following equation

Note that although the equation reduces to the Lane-Emden equation with polytropic index , the initial condition is not that of the Lane-Emden equation.

Limiting mass for large central densities
When the central density becomes large, i.e.,  or equivalently , the governing equation reduces to

This is exactly the Lane-Emden equation with polytropic index . Note that in this limit of large densities, the radius 

tends to zero. The mass of the white dwarf however tends to a finite limit

The Chandrasekhar limit follows from this limit.

See also 

Emden–Chandrasekhar equation
Lane–Emden equation

References

Equations of astronomy
Equations of physics
Fluid dynamics
Stellar dynamics
White dwarfs
Ordinary differential equations